Sellers House may refer to:

Sellers House (Beebe, Arkansas), listed on the NRHP in Arkansas
Sellers House (Conway, Arkansas), listed on the NRHP in Arkansas
Sellers Farm, Maysville, AR, listed on the NRHP in Arkansas
Sellers Mansion, Baltimore, MD, listed on the NRHP in Maryland
Salome Sellers House, Deer Isle, ME, listed on the NRHP in Maine
Cook-Sellers House, DeSoto, MS, listed on the NRHP in Mississippi
Sellers House (Pittsburgh, Pennsylvania), listed on the NRHP in Pennsylvania
Ball-Sellers House, Arlington, VA, listed on the NRHP in Virginia